The men's football tournament at the 2019 Pan American Games was held in Lima from 29 July to 10 August 2019.

Qualification
A total of eight men's teams qualified to compete at the games, four CONMEBOL teams and four CONCACAF teams. For CONMEBOL, the best three teams at the 2019 South American U-20 Championship qualified, while Peru automatically qualified as hosts. For CONCACAF, the best team from each of the three zones (North American, Central American and Caribbean) at the 2018 CONCACAF U-20 Championship qualified, however, United States (best North American team) declined to participate and were replaced by Mexico. Honduras also qualified by decision of CONCACAF.

Qualified teams

Draw
The draw of the tournament was held on 12 April 2019, 12:00 PET (UTC−5), at the Peruvian Football Federation headquarters in Lima, Peru. The eight teams were drawn into two groups of four and each group was conformed by two CONCACAF teams and two CONMEBOL teams. The hosts Peru were seeded into group B and assigned to position 4 in their group, while the remaining seven teams were placed into two pots according to the confederation which they belong.

The CONCACAF teams were drawn first and assigned to positions 1 and 2 in groups A and B. Then, the CONMEBOL teams were drawn and the first two teams occupied positions 3 and 4 in group A while the third team occupied the position 3 in group B. The draw resulted in the following groups:

The draw was led by Hugo Figueredo, competition director of CONMEBOL, and had the help of Miriam Tristan and Cindy Novoa members of the Peru women's national football team

Squads

Players must be born on or after 1 January 1997, three overage players are allowed.

Match officials
The referees and assistant referees were:

 Fernando Echenique
Assistants: Cristian Navarro and Lucas Germanotta
 Wagner Magalhaes
Assistants: Emerson De Carvalho and Alessandro Rocha
 Felipe González
Assistants: Raúl Orellana and Edson Cisternas
 Gustavo Murillo
Assistants: Miguel Roldán and John Gallego
 Ulises Mereles
Assistants: Juan Zorrilla  and Rodney Aquino
 Michael Espinoza
Assistants: Michael Orué and Stephen Atoche
 Miguel Santibañez
Assistants: Raúl López and Jesús Sánchez
 José Argote
Assistants: Franchescoly Chacón and Alberto Ponte

Group stage
Tie-breakers 

All times are local, PET (UTC−5).

Group A

Group B

Placement stage (5th–8th place)

Seventh place match

Fifth place match

Knockout stage
If necessary, extra time and penalty shoot-out are used to decide the winner.

Semi-finals

Bronze medal match

Gold medal match

Final standings

Goalscorers

References

External links

 
Football at the 2019 Pan American Games